The Hearing Research is a peer-reviewed monthly journal that publishes research work with basic peripheral and central auditory mechanisms.

Indexing and abstracting
According to the Journal Citation Reports, the journal has a 2017 impact factor of 2.824. The journal in indexed in the following bibliographic databases:
 BIOSIS
 Elsevier BIOBASE
 Chemical Abstracts
 Current Contents/Life Sciences
 MEDLINE
 EMBASE
 INSPEC
 Pascal et Francis (INST-CNRS)
 Reference Update
 Scopus

References

Publications established in 1978
Audiology journals
Elsevier academic journals
Monthly journals